Pamela Claire Mordecai (born 1942) is a Jamaican-born poet, novelist, short story writer, scholar and anthologist who lives in Canada.

Biography 

Born in Kingston, Jamaica, she attended high school in Jamaica, and Newton College of the Sacred Heart in Newton, MA, where she did a first degree in English. A trained language-arts teacher with a PhD in English from the University of the West Indies, she has taught at secondary and tertiary levels, trained teachers, edited an academic journal, and worked in media, especially television, and in publishing.

Mordecai has written articles on Caribbean literature, education and publishing, and has collaborated on, or herself written, more than 30 books, including textbooks, children's books, six books of poetry for adults, a collection of short fiction, a novel, and (with her husband, Martin Mordecai) a reference work on Jamaica. She has edited several anthologies, including the Sunsong series. Her poems and stories for children are widely collected and have been used in textbooks in the UK, Canada, the US, West Africa, the Caribbean and Malaysia. Her short stories have been published in journals and anthologies in the Caribbean, the US and Canada. Her poetry was included in the 1992 anthology Daughters of Africa. Her play El Numero Uno had its world premiere in February 2010 at the Lorraine Kimsa Theatre for Young People in Toronto, Canada.

Mordecai has lived in Canada since 1994, but the Caribbean experience, both in the region and in the diaspora, continues to be an important preoccupation in her writing. In 2013 she was awarded a Bronze Musgrave Medal by the Institute of Jamaica. In spring 2014, she was a fellow at Yaddo artists' community in Saratoga Springs, New York.

Some of her works are written in Jamaican creole.

Works
 Jamaica Woman (ed., with Mervyn Morris) (1980), anthology. .
 New Caribbean Junior Reader 3 (with Grace Walker Gordon) (1985, new ed. 2004). .
 New Caribbean Junior Reader 4 (with Grace Walker Gordon) (1986, new ed. 2004). .
 Journey Poem (1987), poetry. 
 New Caribbean Infant Reader 1 (with Grace Walker Gordon) (1987). .
 From Our Yard: Jamaican Poetry since Independence (ed.) (1987), anthology. .
 Story Poems: a first collection (1987), poetry for children. .
 Her True-True Name (ed., with Elizabeth Wilson) (1989), anthology. .
 Don't Ever Wake a Snake (1991), poems and stories for children. .
 Sunsong Tide Rising (ed., with Grace Walker Gordon) (1994) anthology. .
 de Man: a performance poem (1995), poetry. .
 Ezra's Goldfish and other storypoems (1995), poetry for children. .
 Rohan Goes to Big School (2000), story for children. .
 The Costume Parade (2000), story for children. .
 Certifiable (2001), poetry. .
 Culture and Customs of Jamaica (with Martin Mordecai) (2001). .
 The True Blue of Islands (2005), poetry. .
 Calling Cards: New Poetry from Caribbean/Canadian Women (ed.) (2005). .
 Pink Icing and other stories (2006), short stories. .
 El Numero Uno, play commissioned by the Young People's Theatre, world premiere in Toronto, Canada, in 2010.
 New Junior English Revised (with Haydn Richards and Grace Walker Gordon) (2012). . 
 Subversive Sonnets (2012), poetry. .
 Red Jacket: a novel (2015), fiction, .
 de book of Mary: a performance poem (2015), poetry,

References

Further reading
"Contemporary Caribbean Writers in Conversation: Interview with Pamela Mordecai" in Wadabegei, Volume 7, No. 2, Summer/Fall 2004, pp. 73–83.
Interview with Pamela Mordecai in Why We Write: Conversations with African Canadian Poets and Novelists (Paperback) (ed. H. Nigel Thomas), TSAR Publications, 2006.

External links
 Official website
 "Pamela Mordecai", Caribbean Canadian Literary Expo, 2003
 Stephanie May McKenzie, Shoshannah Ganz, "Salt Fish and Ackee: An Interview with Pamela Mordecai", Postcolonial Text, Vol. 6, No. 1 (2011)
 "Ten Questions with Pamela Mordecai", Open Book Toronto, 29 April 2009
 49th Shelf blog.
 "The Lucky Seven Interview, with Pamela Mordecai", Open Book Toronto, 4 March 2015

1942 births
Living people
People from Kingston, Jamaica
20th-century Jamaican poets
20th-century Canadian poets
21st-century Canadian poets
Canadian women poets
Canadian women children's writers
Jamaican emigrants to Canada
20th-century Canadian women writers
21st-century Canadian women writers
Recipients of the Musgrave Medal
21st-century Canadian short story writers
Canadian women short story writers
21st-century Canadian novelists
Canadian women novelists
21st-century Jamaican poets
Jamaican children's writers
Jamaican women children's writers
Jamaican women poets
20th-century Canadian short story writers
Women anthologists
Newton College of the Sacred Heart alumni